Bale (previously Valle d'Istria) is a settlement and municipality in Istria County, Croatia. 

The origins of the settlement lie in the Roman stronghold of Castrum Vallis, built by Caius Palcrus to protect the salt-pan road from Pula to Poreč.

The municipality is officially bilingual, Croatian and Italian, hence both names are official and equal. Bale is connected to the Croatian highway network by an exit on the A9 motorway (E751), part of the Istrian Y.

Municipal settlements 
There are three settlements within the municipality (as of 2006), they are:

 Bale – Valle,
 Golaš i
 Krmed.

Geography 
The municipality of Bale borders the town of Rovinj, the municipalities of Kanfanar, Svetvinčenat and Vodnjan. The village is 13 km away from Rovinj and 20 km from Pula. The rocks of Kolona and Porer belong to the municipality.

The area of the municipality of Bale is 81.90 km2.

Population 
According to the last census from 2011, the municipality of Bale had 1127 inhabitants, distributed in 3 settlements:

Ethnic composition, 2001 

According to official data from 2011, the municipality of Bale has 1,127 inhabitants.

Administration 
In order to perform executive tasks, the municipality is not elected by the municipality, but its duties are performed by the Municipal Council. The municipal council has a president, two vice presidents and consists of 11 members. The President of the Municipal Council performs the duty of the Municipal Mayor, and the duty of the Deputy Municipal Mayor is performed by the Vice-Presidents of the Municipal Council.

The day of the municipality is May 1, which is celebrated in honor of Blessed Julian, the patron saint of the municipality.

In the municipality of Bale, the official use of Croatian and the language of the Italian national minority and the Latin alphabet is equal, except in the towns of Čubani, Golaš, Krmed and Pižanovac. In the area of the Municipality, all public inscriptions are displayed in Croatian and Italian.

History 
Dinosaur fossils have been found near Bale. The most significant fossils are the fossils of Histriasaurus, which was discovered at this site and are kept at the local museum.. Of the other dinosaur fossils, unidentified fossils belonging to the Camarasauridae family, the clusters Titanosauriformes, Somphospondyli, Theropoda, and another fossil of an unidentified dinosaur were found. A fossil of Campanellula capuensis belonging to the Cretaceous of the genus Campanellula was also found. These fossils were described by Fabio Marco Dalla Vecchia from 1998 to 2005. 

Castrum Vallis was the name of an ancient settlement that existed on the site of today's Bale. The settlement was founded by Caius Palcrus, and the role of the settlement was primarily defensive. Thus, Bale defended the road that led to Pula, but also the salt pans that existed at the time. Vallum means moat, so it is assumed that the ancient Bales were protected by a moat.

Coins found from this period testify to the ancient Bales today, even the remains of Roman buildings that are discovered almost as in Pula - as soon as you start digging you will come across something.

Economy 
Tourism is the main service activity.

Famous people 

 Blessed Juliano Balski, Franciscan, priest, (died 1349)
 Domenico Cernecca, linguist and journalist

Monuments and landmarks 
 Holy Spirit Church built in the 15th century.
The Soardo Bembo Palace is still the largest building in Bale. It was formed from two square defensive towers. At the turn of the 14th and 15th centuries, a residential part of the palace decorated with Gothic quadriphores was built between these two towers (until then connected by a bridge).

The first owners of the palace were from the Soardo family. Left without male heirs in 1618, Veronica Soardo married Alvise Bembo, making the palace the property of the Bembo family. Today the building has been renovated. It is mainly used by the Italian Community.

Education 
In schools with Croatian as the language of instruction, Italian is taught as the language of the social environment, and in schools with Italian as the language of instruction, Croatian is taught.

Culture 
The association of citizens "Stone Stories" operates in the place. In her organization, the "Last Minute Open Jazz Festival" takes place every summer in Bale:

 Organizer: Tomislav Pavleka

 Art director: prof. Ratko Zjača

 Producer and photographer: mr.sc. Gordan Topic, (alias Gordan Nia)

Also every year in the gallery Ulika is held an exhibition "Castrum Vallis", which is attended by many famous painters. The exhibition, in which academic artists, but also those without higher education, present their worldview, was started in 1964 by Vasilije Jordan, Dragica Cvek Jordan and Milan Cmelić, and was soon joined by Predrag Goll, a Slavonian who spends most of the year in Bale. At the beginning, the founders could not even dream of how many authors would participate in this project, and only this year there are 72. In none of their periods was the Castrum Vallis exhibition burdened with competition, but it was an ideal place for summer gatherings of artists. She synthesized traditions and wisdom, with reference to her own environment and the inspiration offered by the sun, sea, land and stone combined with spirit and emotion.

The Women's Klapa "Castrum Vallis" operates in Bale. The president of the klapa is Mrs. Jasna Volarević - Ibrić.

Sport 

 The following sports clubs operate in the municipality:
 NK Jedinstvo, football club
 Sport fishing society Colone 04,
 Hunting Society Jarebica,
 Women's handball club Bale,
 Budokai Club Lav,
 Bale Women's Volleyball Club.
 

There are two football fields.

See also
 Barbariga, Croatia

References

Municipalities of Croatia
Populated places in Istria County
Italian-speaking territorial units in Croatia